The PBA Developmental League, or PBA D-League, is the Philippine Basketball Association's official minor league basketball organization.

History 

The PBA D-League was conceptualized after the collapse of the proposed merger between the Philippine Basketball League (PBL) and Liga Pilipinas after the staging of the Tournament of the Philippines which was composed by PBL and Liga Pilipinas teams. PBA Commissioner Chito Salud proposed the formation of a PBA D-League, which will fill the void left by the PBL. On January 25, 2011, the PBA Board of Governors approved the proposal.

The maiden tournament, named "Foundation Cup" began on March 12, 2011 at the Filoil Flying V Arena in San Juan. The tournament composed of 13 teams, with five teams (Junior Powerade, NLEX, Maynilad, Freego and Cafe France) having affiliation with existing PBA teams. Four teams (Cobra Energy Drink, Agri-Nature Inc./FCA, Pharex, and Cafe France) from the Philippine Basketball League filed for application in the PBA D-League, when they failed to acquire a sixth team in order to smoothly run the league. The NLEX Road Warriors became the champions of the tournament, winning two games to none against the Cebuana Lhuillier Gems.

The second tournament, dubbed as the "Aspirant's Cup" began on October 20. Four teams (Maynilad, Junior Powerade, Max Bond and Pharex) did not join the  tournament. However, two new teams (Boracay Rum and Informatics) made their debut in the D-League.

The D-League has held its own rookie draft since the 2013–14 PBA season.

In August 2015, the PBA approved plans for a nationwide D-League and a Women's D-League that will open soon. From 2016, the men's competition was first to be held in three separate, simultaneous tournaments, first in Luzon and later in the Visayas and Mindanao. The three regional champions would join the national championship round which would be joined by Metro Manila teams. However the plan was never fully realized with the Northern Luzon tournament never finished and the Visayas tournament cancelled.

The 2020 season was indefinitely postponed in March 2020 with only some games of the Aspirants Cup played before the season was cancelled altogether in September 2020 due to the COVID-19 pandemic. The league has not held games as of 2021. The resumption of the D-League has been hampered by the fact that league heavily relies on school-based teams.

Teams 
Teams in the PBA D-League had to pay a participating fee either on a per conference or per season basis. Unlike the PBA, the number of participating teams may vary per conference.

Current teams
The following are the participating teams of the 2022 PBA D-League Aspirants Cup:

Former teams

List of champions

See also 
 Philippine Basketball Association
 PBA Rush
 Basketball in the Philippines
 List of developmental and minor sports leagues

References

External links 
Official Website

 
2011 establishments in the Philippines
Sports leagues established in 2011
Basketball leagues in the Philippines
Professional sports leagues in the Philippines